Lyra Reef is a remote submerged coral atoll, about  in diameter, extending over an area of .

Within the reef, in the lagoon, there are depths of exceeding . A gap on the north-west side of the reef gives access to this deep water.

See also
 List of reefs

References

External links
Nautical chart of Lyra Reef

Reefs of Papua New Guinea
Coral reefs